Despite popular stereotypes in the media that there is a singular New Jersey accent, there are in fact several distinct accents native to the U.S. state of New Jersey, none being confined only to New Jersey. Therefore, the term New Jersey English is diverse and often misleading, and it may refer to any of the following dialects of American English (mostly New York City English and Philadelphia English), or even intermediate varieties that blend features of these multiple dialects.

African-American dialect
Working- and middle-class African Americans throughout New Jersey commonly speak African-American Vernacular English (AAVE), regardless of the area of the state in which they were raised. New Jersey AAVE commonly includes a distinction between the vowels of cot and caught, as well as notable fronting of the  vowel.

New York metropolitan dialect

The dialect of greater New York City is spoken in northeastern New Jersey, plus Middlesex and Monmouth Counties. Therefore, the short-a system of these areas of New Jersey is most similar to the New York City split-a system, however with some variation. East of the Hackensack River, William Labov finds the short-a system to occur with no more variation than in New York City proper. However, west of the Hackensack River, he finds that the normal function word constraint of New York City English is lost and the open syllable constraint becomes variable. While most of the New York metropolitan dialect heard in New Jersey is rhotic, that of Newark and Jersey City (just across the Hudson River from New York City) may be non-rhotic or "r-dropping".

Northern dialect

Outside of the New York metropolitan area, regional English of North Jersey was classified as part of the broad Northern U.S. dialect region by The Atlas of North American English in 2006 and part of the Hudson Valley lexical region by Hans Kurath in 1949. Here, the  vowel remains very far back in the mouth. Like Inland Northern English but unlike New York City English, the accent backs  and fronts , so that both vowels are centralized, distinguished from each other only by height.
However, unlike the Inland Northern accent, this accent uses the nasal short-a system.

Philadelphia metropolitan dialect

The regional dialect of the Mid-Atlantic States, in this case Philadelphia English specifically, is spoken in South Jersey and some parts of Central Jersey, including most of Ocean County. Generally, the closer a speaker was raised to the city of Philadelphia, the more features their variety will share with the Philadelphia sub-dialect, such as use of the term hoagie to mean submarine sandwich (or sub).

References

Bibliography

Further reading
"Where do N.J.'s different accents actually come from? A linguist weighs in" by Kelly Roncace, NJ.com, May 20, 2017

External links
Category:New Jersey English, Wiktionary

American English
English